The Accademia Nazionale di Santa Cecilia Musical Instruments Museum (MUSA) is the museum holding the instruments collection of musical instruments of the Accademia Nazionale di Santa Cecilia.

Description
Its location is the Auditorium Parco della Musica in Rome, Italy. It was designed by architect Renzo Piano and inaugurated in February 2008. In the exhibition gallery some 130 instruments are on display and about 50 luthiery tools in an open-air laboratory where the museum luthiers work.

Collection
The exhibition path moves through plucked string instruments, bowed, winds, harps, lyres and also includes keyboards. Amongst the most important instruments in the collection is the violin known as the 'Tuscan Strad' built by Antonio Stradivari in 1690 together with the four instruments forming the so-called 'Maedicean quintet', built for the Grand Prince Ferdinando de' Medici. Another outstanding piece is the viola by David Tecchler, the German born luthier who worked in Rome in the first half of 1700 and maker of some of the best instruments of the time. His is also one of the fine mandolins from the private collection of queen Margherita di Savoia who left as legacy to the museum.
Audio Tour: Users can hire a PDA with an audio tour of the museum presenting twenty remarkable examples with pictures of the instruments.

See also
 List of music museums

External links
 MUSA - Accademia Nazionale di Santa Cecilia Musical Instruments Museum (official website)
 Accademia Nazionale di Santa Cecilia (official website)
 Auditorium Parco della Musica, Roma (location of the museum and)
 

2008 establishments in Italy
Museums in Rome
Museums established in 2008
Renzo Piano buildings
Music museums in Italy
Musical instrument museums in Italy
Rome Q. II Parioli